George Wayne Smith (born January 29, 1955) is a bishop of the Episcopal Church, currently serving as the Bishop Provisional of the Episcopal Diocese of Southern Ohio. He previously served as the 10th Bishop of the Episcopal Diocese of Missouri from 2002 to his retirement in 2020. He was succeeded by the 11th bishop, the Rt. Rev. Deon K. Johnson, on June 13, 2020.

Smith was born in Abilene, Texas. He was raised a Baptist and converted to the Episcopal Church while a student at Baylor University. Smith received his seminary education at Nashotah House in Milwaukee, Wisconsin. Smith was ordained as a deacon in 1981 followed by ordination to the priesthood in 1982. Smith served congregations in both Texas and Michigan before becoming the rector of St. Andrew's Episcopal Church in Des Moines, Iowa.

On November 3, 2001 Smith was elected to the post of Bishop of Missouri, having been elected on third ballot. He was consecrated on March 6, 2002 as Bishop Coadjutor to Bishop Hays Rockwell and subsequently succeeded him on June 6, 2002. Smith is the 975th Bishop consecrated in the Episcopal Church.

In the first years of his episcopacy, the church, both nationally and locally, struggled with issues related to sexuality. Financial adversity in those early years resulted in a reduction of diocesan staff and programs. Bishop Smith has supported the growth of the Community of Deacons within the Diocese. The Diocese has entered into a productive companion relationship with the Diocese of Lui in Sudan with clergy and lay persons involved in on-site missions there. Congregations are being called to develop mission within their communities, strengthening their three part call to prayer, community and a presence beyond the church doors.

In a letter dated April 27, 2018, Smith informed the Diocese of Missouri that he intended to retire after a successor was elected, consecrated as bishop, and installed in office. He asked that the election be held during the 2019 diocesan convention, with the winner of the election being seated in April 2020.

On November 23, 2019 the diocese elected Deon K. Johnson as Smith's successor.

Smith was elected Provisional Bishop of the Diocese of Southern Ohio in 2021.

See also
 List of Episcopal bishops of the United States
 List of bishops of the Episcopal Church in the United States of America

References

External links
 Smith on the Episcopal Diocese of Missouri website

1955 births
Living people
People from Abilene, Texas
Clergy from Des Moines, Iowa
Episcopal bishops of Missouri
Baylor University alumni
Nashotah House alumni
Converts to Anglicanism from Baptist denominations
Episcopal bishops of Southern Ohio